The following is a list of exercises of the Indian Army.

See also 
 List of exercises of the Indian Air Force

References

Indian Army